The 1989 Hungarian Grand Prix was a Formula One motor race held at Hungaroring on 13 August 1989. It was the tenth race of the 1989 Formula One World Championship.

The 77-lap race was won by Nigel Mansell, driving a Ferrari. After qualifying only 12th, Mansell charged through the field and took the lead with an opportunistic overtaking manoeuvre on Ayrton Senna in the McLaren-Honda as the two were lapping Stefan Johansson in the Onyx-Ford. Senna finished 26 seconds behind Mansell, with Thierry Boutsen third in a Williams-Renault.

Senna's teammate and Drivers' Championship rival, Alain Prost, finished fourth, meaning that his lead over Senna in the championship was reduced to 14 points.

Qualifying

Pre-qualifying report
The Hungaroring had been changed from the year before; the tight, slow S-bends after Turn 4 had been bypassed, extending the straight into Turns 5 and 6; raising the circuit's average speed by 10 percent.

In the Friday morning pre-qualifying session, an Onyx topped the time sheets for the fourth Grand Prix in succession. Stefan Johansson was comfortably fastest, and his team-mate Bertrand Gachot also pre-qualified in fourth. Both drivers had re-signed with Onyx for 1990. For the first time this season, Piercarlo Ghinzani went through to the main qualifying sessions, in second place. For the third time this season, and for the first time since the US Grand Prix, he outpaced his Osella team-mate Nicola Larini, who missed out in fifth position. The Larrousse-Lola of Michele Alboreto was the other pre-qualifier in third, the Italian suffering from a cracked rib. His team-mate Philippe Alliot was down in sixth, the first time either he or a Larrousse had failed to pre-qualify.

The AGS cars of Yannick Dalmas and Gabriele Tarquini were seventh and ninth respectively, while Zakspeed drivers Bernd Schneider and Aguri Suzuki, still hampered by their underpowered Yamaha engines, were eighth and twelfth. Roberto Moreno was tenth in the Coloni, while his team-mate Pierre-Henri Raphanel was unable to post a representative time and was bottom of the time sheets in his last appearance for the team. Gregor Foitek was still unable to pre-qualify the new EuroBrun car, and was eleventh fastest.

Pre-qualifying classification

Qualifying report
Riccardo Patrese took a surprise pole position in his Williams-Renault, the first and only non-McLaren pole of the season, beating Ayrton Senna by three-tenths of a second. In another surprise, Alex Caffi took third in his Dallara, just six-tenths behind Senna, with Thierry Boutsen fourth in the second Williams. Drivers' Championship leader Alain Prost was fifth in the second McLaren, with Gerhard Berger sixth in the Ferrari. The top ten was completed by Alessandro Nannini in the Benetton, Stefano Modena in the Brabham, Derek Warwick in the Arrows and Pierluigi Martini in the Minardi.

Nigel Mansell could only manage 12th in the second Ferrari, nearly seven-tenths behind teammate Berger and over two seconds behind Patrese, and later complained of traffic.

Qualifying classification

Race

Race report
At the start of the race, Patrese, Senna and Caffi maintained their grid order into turn 1, while Boutsen lost out to Prost as Berger passed both of them. Further back, Mansell made a good start, rising to 8th at the first corner. It soon became clear, however, that Caffi was struggling, the Dallara unable to replicate the speed it had shown in qualifying. Before long he had been passed by both Berger and Prost, and was holding up a train of cars consisting of Boutsen, Nannini, Mansell and Warwick.

Nannini exited the train when he pulled in to change tyres. This promoted Mansell to 7th, which he quickly turned into 5th by passing Boutsen and Caffi in quick succession. He then set about closing the 17-second gap to the leaders, and was promoted to 4th when Berger pitted for tyres. Having caught up to the leading group, Mansell passed Prost for 3rd. Patrese's Williams then began to develop a problem with a holed radiator, which slowed him and bunched up the leading group. Eventually, Patrese's holed radiator became so bad that both Senna and Mansell were able to pass him in the space of a few corners. Patrese retired from the race shortly afterwards.

Mansell now began to pressure Senna, clearly faster but unable to pass due to the extra power of the McLaren's Honda engine. Meanwhile, Prost pitted for tyres and rejoined 6th, while Berger only inherited 3rd briefly before he retired with gearbox problems, leaving Senna and Mansell on their own. Eventually, the pair came up to lap Stefan Johansson's Onyx. Senna caught him at an awkward moment, just at the accelerating zone out of turn 3. The Brazilian uncharacteristically hesitated, briefly lifting off, and this allowed Mansell to draw alongside as they went past Johansson and then use the Ferrari's greater momentum to surge past Senna and take the lead. After that, Mansell had an unchallenged run to the flag, beating Senna by nearly 26 seconds, with Boutsen completing the podium. Prost overtook Eddie Cheever's Arrows for 4th on the final lap, while Nelson Piquet's Lotus rounded off the points scorers.

Many of the leading cars had problems with tyre vibrations - both Senna and Mansell complained about this, whilst Prost also had difficulties after picking up debris whilst going offline to avoid Patrese's oil.

Race classification

Championship standings after the race

Drivers' Championship standings

Constructors' Championship standings

References

Hungarian Grand Prix
Hungarian Grand Prix
Grand Prix
Hungarian Grand Prix